Ayşe Ören (born May 28, 1980) is a multidisciplinary artist, architect, and designer.  Her works are on the contemporary and conceptual side that include abstract art, sculpture, furniture and product design, and graphic design.  Educated as an architect, her broad interests span such fields as history, philosophy and psychology, and space architecture.

Early life 
After finishing the high school at TED Ankara College Foundation Schools, she studied Architecture, Interior Architecture and Environmental Design at Bilkent University in Ankara, Turkey and graduated in 2006.

Career
She was the first designer to be accepted into A Technopark (Boğaziçi University). Her works connect art and technology, drawing it into research and development. She aims to build an interdisciplinary system, create new products combining technology and design, while meeting requirements.
 
She adopts multi-disciplinary approaches, by interpreting them based on cultural experience and future needs.

She collaborates with a team combining disciplines and backgrounds. Topics include environmental awareness, energy efficiency, smart cities and the Internet of Things (IoT).

She embarked on a project titled 'Smartables' that converts living spaces into comfortable, safe and manageable areas. She aims to build somatosensory bridges between cities and people.

Select exhibitions

Solo exhibitions
 2009 – Istanbul Design Week, Kiss Chair, Turkey
 2010 – Istanbul Design Week, dönme dolap (ferris wheel), Turkey
 2010 – JCI World Congress, Osaka Japan, Paradox

Group Exhibitions
 2010 – 100% Design London
 2012 – States of Matter Exhibition, Armaggan Art&Design Gallery, Istanbul 	
 2013 – Ministry of Science, Industry and Technology, the 1st Edition of Technology Development Zones Summit 
 2013– AKIB (Mediterranean Exporters' Associations) Furniture R&D Project Exhibition Change (modular bookcase) Mersin, Turkey
 2013– Innovation Week – Furniture R&D Modular Bookcase- Change
 2013– Istanbul Design Week- Modular Bookcase, Change, with the Design Spirit Group, 40 Turkish Designers
 2013– Ministry of Science, Industry and Technology- Techno-initiative summit- Modular bookcase Change, Istanbul, Turkey
 2014– Jacop De Baan – Dream Design collaboration, overseas activities to introduce the Turkish designers internationally
 Dutch Design Week
 London Design Festival
 Istanbul Design Week
 2014– Contemporary International- Galley MCDR, Sculpture Too Funky
 2015– Design Spirit- 40 Turkish Designers, DDF and Development Agency, Products Greater and Rockets

Recognition

 2009 – Michael Jackson "Live Forever Monument" design competition – Off the Wall – People's Choice – World first prize – USA
 2009 – British Council, Design Entrepreneur of the Year
 2010 – Ministry of Science, Industry and Technology, the first designer to receive the Techno-initiative capital support
 
 2010 – Boğaziçi University, Technopark, the first design company to be accepted amongst the Organizations and Technoparks
 2010 – 10 Outstanding People of TOYP Turkey – Cultural Field – First Prize in Turkey
 2012 – HayalEt Innovation, Business Development and Entrepreneurship Platform operated by Boğaziçi University, Business Development Training

References

1980 births
Living people
People from Ankara
TED Ankara College Foundation Schools alumni
Bilkent University alumni
Turkish designers
Turkish women sculptors
21st-century Turkish sculptors
21st-century Turkish women artists